Ahmad Mehdizadeh (born 1 March 1987 in Bandar Anzali) is an Iranian footballer who currently plays for Saipa in Iran Pro League.

References

1987 births
Living people
Iranian footballers
Association football defenders
Paykan F.C. players
Malavan players
Saba players
People from Qaem Shahr
Sportspeople from Mazandaran province
21st-century Iranian people